Maeva Douma (born 25 February 2005) is a Cameroonian cricketer who plays for the Cameroon women's cricket team. In September 2021, she dismissed four batters in one match by running them out at the non-striker's end, a form of dismissal known as "Mankading". It was only the second time that four run outs had been affected by one cricketer in a women's international match.

Douma began playing cricket while in school, after seeing a match being played where she lived, before joining a local cricket club. She plays as an all-rounder.

In September 2021, Douma was named in Cameroon's squad for the 2021 ICC Women's T20 World Cup Africa Qualifier tournament in Botswana. It was Cameroon's debut at an International Cricket Council (ICC) women's event. She made her Women's Twenty20 International (WT20I) debut for Cameroon on 12 September 2021, in their first match of the tournament, against Uganda. Douma took a wicket with her second delivery of the match, bowling Uganda's opener Prosscovia Alako. She then went on to dismiss Kevin Awino, Rita Musamali, Immaculate Nakisuuyi and Janet Mbabazi, all by running them out at the non-striker's end. However, Uganda went on to win the match by 155 runs, after Cameroon only made 35 runs before being bowled out.

See also
 List of Mankading incidents in cricket

References

External links
 

2005 births
Living people
Cameroonian cricketers
Cameroon women Twenty20 International cricketers
Sportspeople from Yaoundé